Jenkins Place are two historic homes and, together, a national historic district located at Orleans, Orange County, Indiana.  The Rock and Lucie Jenkins House was built in 1908, and is a -story, American Foursquare brick dwelling., with Prairie School influences.  The Ralph and Margaret Jenkins House was built in 1912, and is a -story, Bungalow / American Craftsman style frame dwelling.  It has a steeply pitched roof covered in green tile.  Other contributing resources include a garage, concrete corner posts, fencing, former goldfish pond, and two cisterns.

It was listed on the National Register of Historic Places in 2010.

References

Historic districts on the National Register of Historic Places in Indiana
Bungalow architecture in Indiana
Houses completed in 1908
Houses completed in 1912
Houses in Orange County, Indiana
Historic districts in Orange County, Indiana
National Register of Historic Places in Orange County, Indiana
1908 establishments in Indiana